Tixkokob Municipality (In the Yucatec Maya Language: “Place of the poisonous snakes”) is one of the 106 subdivisions of the State of Yucatán in Mexico. Its municipal seat is located in the City of Tixkokob. The town of Tixkokob is famous within the area for high quality hammock weaving. The municipality made up largely of working class communities.

Location
Tixkokob is located in the center of the Yucatán henequen zone, about 24 miles east of the city of Merida, capital of the state. Tixkokob is about halfway along the road from Merida to Izamal.

History
In antiquity, it was part of the province of Ceh-Pech. Upon the conquest, it became part of the encomienda system. It is referenced in a document dated 1549, indicating 540 indigenous persons affiliated with the encomendero.

In 1821, Yucatán was declared independent of the Spanish Crown. In 1825 the area was part of the Coastal region, with its headquarters in Izamal. On 10 April 1843, 500 soldiers under the command of Lieutenant Colonel Francisco Pérez and General Peña y Barragán, defended the Mexican government against separatist Yucatecan forces in Tixkokob.

In July 1867, Tixkokob was designated as a Villa by the State Congress. In 1914, it was elevated to the rank of city, but a few months later demoted again. In 1923 the ejido system was put in place and Tixkokob became a free pueblo.

Governance
The municipal president is elected for a term of three years. The president appoints nine Councilpersons to serve on the board for three year terms, as the Secretary and councilors of culture, public image, public works, sports, ecology, cemeteries, parks and gardens, and nomenclature.

Communities
The municipality is made up of 17 different communities, of which the most important are:

Places of interest
 The archaeological zone of Ake is located in the municipality of Tixkokob, 15 kilometers from the township of Tixkokob.
 Cenote Yaax Ha
 Hacienda Ruinas de Ake
 Hacienda Hubila
 Hacienda Kankabchén
 Hacienda Kanyunyun
 Hacienda Katanchel
 Hacienda Nohchan
 Hacienda Oncan
 Hacienda San Antonio Millet
 Hacienda Santa María Chí

Notables
Notable locals include the following:

Hernando Pech

Tixkokob chieftain who was accused of attending a Tehchamac human sacrifice, Tehchamac was located near the border of the province of Chepech Chacan.

Ah Kin Chablé

Tixkokob priest, who served as an informant to Adelantado Montejo. The Maya priest converted to Christianity and took the name of D. Lorenzo Chablé.

Arsenio Puerto Lara

A supporter of Carrillo Puerto and a member of the socialist league when she was young. Carrillo Puerto  received the support of thousands of henequen workers. General Cardenas supported Lara to succeed General Canto Echeverria. In his tenure at the Committee, Lara obtained significant benefits for the farmers of Tixkokob.

Carlos R. Menéndez

Writer, journalist and historian (1872–1961), founder of the Printing Company currently publishes the newspaper Diario de Yucatán.

References

Municipalities of Yucatán